Visionworks of America, Inc. 
(formerly known as Doctors' Value Vision) is an American company which operates or manages 711 optical retail stores in 40 U.S. states and the District of Columbia. The company was incorporated in 1988.  It is based in Downtown San Antonio, Texas, and has about 8,000 employees.

Visionworks of America was once a subsidiary of HVHC, a Highmark Inc. company.  Visionwork's former parent company, ECCA Holdings Corp., merged with Pittsburgh-based HVHC in 2006, resulting in Eye Care Centers of America Inc. becoming a wholly owned Highmark subsidiary.
  ECCA had 385 stores, in 36 states, at that time.

All stores sell frames, lenses, sunglasses and accessories. Comprehensive service offerings include contact lens dispensing, in-store labs, and doctors of optometry at or next to every store. Visionworks also sells contact lenses online.

On June 27, 2019, VSP Global announced plans to acquire Visionworks. The acquisition was completed on October 1, 2019.

References

External links

Eyewear companies of the United States
American companies established in 1988
Retail companies established in 1988
Eyewear retailers of the United States
Companies based in San Antonio
2019 mergers and acquisitions